The Slovakia Men's Under-19 National Floorball Team is the men's under-19 national floorball team of the Slovakia, and a member of the International Floorball Federation. The team is composed of the best Slovak floorball players under the age of 19. The Slovak under-19 men's team is currently ranked 6th in the world at floorball. They finished 7th at 2021 U-19 World Floorball Championship in Brno, Czech Republic.

All-time world championships results

World championships results against other teams

References

External links
Slovak Floorball Association
Slovakia on IFF website

Floorball in Slovakia
Men's national floorball teams